Granada (also spelled Gharnata\Ghornata\Ghirnata) is an area in the Capital Governorate of Kuwait, and a suburb of Kuwait City. It consists of four blocks, one of which is undeveloped and unpopulated. It was named after the city of Granada in Spain.

References

Suburbs of Kuwait City